Oliver Crane (born June 19, 1998) is an American rower who formerly held the record of the youngest person to row solo across the Atlantic Ocean until his record was surpassed by Lukas Haitzmann in 2019.

Personal life
Raised in the Lawrenceville section of Lawrence Township, Mercer County, New Jersey, Crane took a year off after graduating from the Peddie School and before he enrolled at Princeton University to undertake his transatlantic journey.

Rowing

Solo Atlantic Row
On December 12, 2017 Crane started his  journey from the Canary Islands to Antigua to become the youngest person to solo row across the Atlantic Ocean. The trip took Crane 44 days in which he lost  in his efforts. Crane raised $73,000 for Oceana, an ocean conservation advocacy organization and HomeFront, a New Jersey charity that helps the homeless. Crane completed his journey in a  vessel that was equipped with navigation systems, a water purifier, freeze-dried food, a radio, and solar panels.

Other Expeditions
Crane has also climbed Mount Elbrus, Mount Kilimanjaro, and Mount Washington.

References

1998 births
Living people
Peddie School alumni
People from Lawrence Township, Mercer County, New Jersey
Princeton University alumni
Sportspeople from Mercer County, New Jersey
American male rowers